The fringed long-footed myotis (Myotis fimbriatus) is a species of vesper bat in the family Vespertilionidae. It is found in China, Taiwan and Hong Kong.

The fringed long-footed myotis is described as having short, thick, brown fur with pale whitish fur ventrally. A captured female was measured with ears that were 14.4 mm long, a forearm 42.2 mm long, and a weight of 9.9 grams.
Myotis fimbriatus is listed as being of least concern by the IUCN as of 2008. In 2000, Myotis fimbriatus was listed as being "lower risk/near threatened".

The species Myotis taiwanensis, initially described as a subspecies of the large-footed bat (Myotis adversus) and reclassified into its own species in 2010, is now thought to be a subspecies of M. fimbriatus.

References

Mouse-eared bats
Mammals of China
Mammals of Taiwan
Mammals of Hong Kong
Mammals described in 1871
Taxonomy articles created by Polbot
Taxa named by Wilhelm Peters
Bats of Asia